In mathematics, the linear algebra concept of dual basis can be applied in the context of a finite extension L/K, by using the field trace. This requires the property that the field trace TrL/K  provides a non-degenerate quadratic form over K. This can be guaranteed if the extension is separable; it is automatically true if K is a perfect field, and hence in the cases where K is finite, or of characteristic zero.

A dual basis is not a concrete basis like the polynomial basis or the normal basis; rather it provides a way of using a second basis for computations.

Consider two bases for elements in a finite field, GF(pm):

and

then B2 can be considered a dual basis of B1 provided

Here the trace of a value in GF(pm) can be calculated as follows:

Using a dual basis can provide a way to easily communicate between devices that use different bases, rather than having to explicitly convert between bases using the change of bases formula.  Furthermore, if a dual basis is implemented then conversion from an element in the original basis to the dual basis can be accomplished with multiplication by the multiplicative identity (usually 1).

References

 , Definition 2.30, p. 54.

Linear algebra
Field extensions
Theory of cryptography